"Why Don't You Get a Job?" is a song by American rock band the Offspring. The song is the 11th track on the Offspring's fifth studio album, Americana (1998), and was released as its second single on March 15, 1999. The song also appears as the eighth track on the band's Greatest Hits album (2005). The single peaked within the top 10 of the charts in several countries, including reaching number two in the United Kingdom, Australia, Iceland, and Sweden.

The song drew attention for its close similarity to the song "Ob-La-Di, Ob-La-Da", as multiple music writers pointed out that the melody and rhythm sounded much like the Beatles' 1968 release from their self-titled double album (also known as the "White Album").

Music video
The music video, directed by McG, was shot on the backlot of Universal Studios Hollywood. Several TV and movie set locations can be seen throughout the video, including Colonial Street (which was used as Wisteria Lane in Desperate Housewives) and Courthouse Square from the Back to the Future film series.
Bob Eubanks, the host of the Newlywed Game, makes a cameo appearance. Towards the end of the video, Guy Cohen, who played the main character in the "Pretty Fly (for a White Guy)" video, makes a short appearance. Chris "X-13" Higgins appears in the video as a lazy boyfriend (as described in the third verse). Pussycat Dolls member Carmit Bachar plays his girlfriend.

The video appears on the Complete Music Video Collection DVD, released in 2005.

Track listings
Australia CD Maxi

Part 2

Later version

Promo CD

Charts

Weekly charts

Year-end charts

Certifications

Release history

Cover versions
South African singer Snotkop translated the song into Afrikaans as "Kry jou ass by die werk" (radio edit titled "Kry jouself by die werk").

References

The Offspring songs
1998 songs
1999 singles
Columbia Records singles
Music videos directed by McG
Number-one singles in Scotland
Ska punk songs
Songs written by Dexter Holland